The Mystic River is a  river in Massachusetts, in the United States. In Massachusett,  means "large estuary," alluding to the tidal nature of the Mystic. The resemblance to the English word  is a coincidence, which the colonists followed.

The Mystic River lies to the north of Boston and flows approximately parallel to the lower portions of the Charles River. Encompassing  of watershed, the river flows from the Lower Mystic Lake and travels through the Boston-area communities of  East Boston,
Chelsea,  Charlestown,  Everett,   
Medford,  Somerville, and 
Arlington. The river joins the Charles River to form inner Boston Harbor. Significant portions of the river's shores are within the Mystic River Reservation and are administered by the Massachusetts Department of Conservation and Recreation, which include a variety of recreation areas.

The Mystic River has a long history of industrial use and a continuing water quality problem. Some sections are undergoing an extensive cleanup as part of the construction of Everett's new Encore Boston Harbor casino.

History

Before recorded history, Native Americans and then later colonists used weirs to catch alewives and fertilize their crops. In 1631, after the arrival of the English, the first ship built by Europeans in Massachusetts, the Blessing of the Bay, was launched from the river's shores. A few years later (1637) the first bridge was built; neighboring towns squabbled about the costs for more than a hundred years.

Over one hundred years later, the Mystic River played a role in the American Revolution when on September 1, 1774, a force of roughly 260 British regulars rowed from Boston up the Mystic River to a landing point near Winter Hill in today's Somerville. From there, they marched about a mile (1.6 km) to the Powder House where a large supply of provincial gunpowder was kept, and after sunrise they removed all the gunpowder, sparking a popular uprising known as the Powder Alarm. In 1775, the Battle of Chelsea Creek took place in the river's watershed in May, and the British attacked via the river's beach in the Battle of Bunker Hill in June.

In 1805 the Middlesex Canal linked the Charles and Mystic Rivers to the Merrimack River in Lowell, and during the 19th century, 10 shipyards along the Mystic River built more than 500 clipper ships. Shipbuilding peaked in the 1840s as schooners and sloops transported timber and molasses for rum distilleries between Medford and the West Indies.

By 1865, overfishing and pollution all but eliminated commercial fishing.

Extensive salt marshes lined the banks of the Mystic until 1909, when the first dam (Craddock Locks) was built across the river, converting salt marsh to freshwater marsh and enabling development. A dam named for Amelia Earhart, was built in 1966. It has three locks to allow the passage of boats, and is equipped with pumps to push fresh water out to the harbor even during high tide. Dam operators leave the locks open at times to allow the passage of fish.  There is a fish ladder, but it has never been functional. The dam is closed to the public.

In 1950, construction was completed on the Maurice J. Tobin Bridge which spans the Mystic River, joining Charlestown and Chelsea.

Wildlife 
At one time, the Mystic River was home to many species of fish, including salmon, alewife, blueback herring, striped bass, bluefish, smallmouth bass, largemouth bass, bluegill, carp and more. Although most of these species still live in the Mystic River, pollution and dam building have severely damaged the populations. Pollution came from various mills and a small ship building yard in the past. The main source of pollution in the 20th century and into the present is from drainage from cities and towns in the watershed. Many of the records of nearby drainage pipes have been lost, or have undocumented changes and diversions. Once described as having so many herring that one could cross the river on their backs, the Mystic River herring run is much smaller than it was in historic times. Pollution has raised bacteria levels and turbidity, making it unfavorable for fish to live in.

In popular culture 
In 1844, Medford abolitionist and writer Lydia Maria Child described her journey across the Mystic to her grandfather's house in the poem "Over the River and Through the Wood." (Grandfather's House, restored by Tufts University in 1976, still stands near the river on South Street in Medford.)

John Townsend Trowbridge's popular 1882 novel, The Tinkham Brothers' Tide-Mill, had its setting along the river at a time when saltwater still reached the Mystic Lakes.

In Dennis Lehane's novel of the same name, Boston-area Mystic River holds a pivotal narrative development in the mystery. Later, Clint Eastwood directed the acclaimed film adaptation.

In the 1861 poem "Paul Revere's Ride" by Henry Wadsworth Longfellow, Paul Revere rides along the banks of the Mystic River.

Crossings

See also
Mystic River Jewish Project

References

External links

 Mystic River Watershed Association
 Mystic River Reservation
 Mystic River Watershed map and 2015 water quality grades

 
Rivers of Middlesex County, Massachusetts
Watersheds of Boston Harbor
Rivers of Massachusetts
Rivers with fish ladders